Jin Wei (born 26 February 1987) is a Chinese rower. He competed in the men's lightweight coxless four event at the 2016 Summer Olympics.

References

External links
 

1987 births
Living people
Chinese male rowers
Olympic rowers of China
Rowers at the 2016 Summer Olympics
Place of birth missing (living people)